Green train may refer to:
the Swedish Gröna tåget project, involving a modified Regina (train) passenger train
the British Rail Class 172, a British passenger train promoted as "green train"